Shepilenko is a surname. Notable people with the surname include:

 Anastasiya Shepilenko (born 2000), Ukrainian alpine skier
 Yuliya Shepilenko (born 1976), Ukrainian alpine skier

See also
 

Ukrainian-language surnames